Ali S. El Sahli (علي الساحلي) (2004–1924) was a Libyan politician who held various government posts between 1952 and 1967.

Place and date of birth
Benghazi, Libya, 3 April 1924.

Education

 LL. B.   (London)
 D. Litt.  (Venice)

Posts held

Decorations

References

External links 

1924 births
2004 deaths
Libyan politicians

Grand Crosses of the Order of George I
Foreign ministers of Libya
Justice ministers of Libya
Transport ministers of Libya
Interior ministers of Libya
Ambassadors of Libya to the United Kingdom
Ambassadors of Libya to Italy
Finance ministers of Libya